VLM Airlines Slovenia was a Slovenian airline based at Maribor Airport. The carrier was a subsidiary of SHS Aviation Slovenia, which is part of SHS Aviation.

History
On 14 May 2017, it was announced that the airline had secured its Air Operator's Certificate (AOC) from the Slovenian Civil Aviation Agency allowing it to carry passengers and cargo. The airline ceased operations alongside its larger sister VLM Airlines in September 2018.

Destinations
As of November 2017, the airline planned to operate scheduled flights between Maribor Edvard Rusjan Airport and both Belgrade and Zurich, and seasonally to both Dubrovnik and Split. However, as of August 2018, none of these routes are flown anymore, with the aircraft being used for charter flights, or have been used within the route network of its now defunct sister company VLM Airlines.

Fleet
The VLM Airlines Slovenia fleet consisted of the following aircraft as of August 2018:

See also
VLM Airlines

References

External links
flyvlm.com

Defunct airlines of Slovenia
Airlines established in 2016
Airlines disestablished in 2018
Slovenian brands
Slovenian companies established in 2016
2018 disestablishments in Slovenia